The Capt. George Scott House, also known locally as the Octagon House and the Collar Box House, is an historic octagon house on Federal Street in Wiscasset, Maine.  Built in 1855, it was added to the National Register of Historic Places on February 23, 1972.

Description and history
The Scott House stands on the east side of Federal Street, overlooking the Sheepscot River to the east, a short way north of the center of Wiscasset.  It is a -story masonry structure, built out of brick with sandstone trim.  A single wood-frame ell extends to the rear of the house, toward the river, where it is joined to a barn that appears to be 5/8 of an octagon.  The main block is covered by an eight-sided roof with an octagonal cupola at its center, with extended eaves adorned with modillions.  The main entrance faces the street, and is sheltered by a porch supported by four chamfered square posts and covered by a modillioned roof.  Windows are set in rectangular openings, with small single-pane windows in the upper half-story that have rounded corners.  The interior retains many original features, and remnants of others, such as a part of a dumbwaiter used to bring food from the original basement kitchen to the dining room.

The house was built in 1855, and was inspired by the work of Orson Squire Fowler, who promoted the design and construction of octagon houses, resulting in a construction fad in the 1850s and 1860s.  It was built for George Scott, a Wiscasset native and successful ship's captain.  A later resident was Edith Augusta Sawyer, an author of children's books.

See also
National Register of Historic Places listings in Lincoln County, Maine
List of octagon houses

References

Houses on the National Register of Historic Places in Maine
Houses in Lincoln County, Maine
Octagon houses in Maine
Buildings and structures in Wiscasset, Maine
Houses completed in 1855
National Register of Historic Places in Lincoln County, Maine
Historic district contributing properties in Maine